Karate at the 2013 Southeast Asian Games was held at Wunna Theikdi Indoor Stadium, Naypyidaw, Myanmar between December 13–15.

Medal table

Medalists

Kata

Kumite

Men

Women

Results

Kata

Men's individual
 13 December 2013

Men's team
 13 December 2013

Women's individual
 13 December 2013

Women's team
 13 December 2013

Kumite

Men's

55 kg
 14 December 2013

60 kg
 14 December 2013

67 kg
 14 December 2013
 Legend - H Hansoku

75 kg
 14 December 2013
 Legend - H Hansoku

84 kg
 14 December 2013

+84 kg
 13 December 2013

Team kumite
 15 December 2013

Women's

50 kg
 14 December 2013

55 kg
 14 December 2013

61 kg
 14 December 2013

68 kg
 14 December 2013

+68 kg
 13 December 2013

Team kumite
 15 December 2013

References

External links
 

2013 Southeast Asian Games events
Southeast Asian Games
2013